Guledakoppa is a village in Dharwad district of Karnataka, India.

Demographics 
As of the 2011 Census of India there were 414 households in Guledakoppa and a total population of 1,844 consisting of 963 males and 881 females. There were 229 children ages 0-6.

References

Villages in Dharwad district